Pedro Álvarez de Toledo y Leiva, 1st Marquis of Mancera (c. 1585–1654), was a Spanish nobleman, general, colonial administrator, and diplomat. He served as Captain General of Galicia and Viceroy of Peru from December 18, 1639 to September 20, 1648.

Early life
Pedro de Toledo was the son of Don Luis de Toledo, 4th Lord of Mancera, and of his second wife Isabel de Leiva. He served with the Spanish armies in Italy, rising to the rank of lieutenant general in the royal galleys of Sicily.

King Philip IV of Spain raised his title from Lord to Marquis of Mancera in 1623. Thereafter he served eight years as governor and Captain General of Galicia.

Viceroy of Peru
Pedro de Toledo was named the 15th Viceroy of Peru in 1639, at the age of 54.  He traveled to the Viceroyalty of Peru with his son Antonio Sebastián de Toledo, who later became the Viceroy of New Spain (1664–73) and 2nd Marquis of Mancera.

As viceroy, Pedro de Toledo introduced the papel sellado (literally, sealed paper). He expanded the naval forces and fortified the ports of Valdivia, Valparaíso, Arica and Callao. Isla Mancera, an island at the mouth of the Valdivia River, is named after him.

He organized literary discussion parties, tertulias a formalized kind of official salon. In these was introduced the mancerina, a ceramic or silver saucer with a framework for holding a jícara, or chocolate cup. The manufacture of mancerinas later became an industry in the Spanish towns of Manises and Talavera.

At the end of his term as viceroy, Pedro de Toledo returned to Spain. He died in Madrid in 1654.

Descendants
Pedro de Toledo was married first to Luisa Feijóo de Novoa y Zamudio, with whom he had one daughter. In 1621 he married for a second time with María Luisa de Salazar y Enríquez de Navarra, 3rd Lady of El Mármol, with whom he had another two children.

By Luisa Feijóo de Novoa:
 Francisca María de Toledo, 2nd Marchioness of Belvis, married Diego Sarmiento de Acuña, 2nd Count of Gondomar
 Pedro Sarmiento, 3rd Marquis of Mancera

By María Luisa de Salazar:
 Antonio Sebastián Álvarez de Toledo, 2nd Marquis of Mancera
 Antonia María de Toledo, married Pedro Garcés, 14th Count of Priego

Ancestry

Additional information

Notes

Sources

External links
  Short biography from Encarta
 —Usuarios.lycos.es: information about marriage of Pedro de Toledo
 —Agn.gob.mx: Papel sellado
 Gourmetsleuth.com: Mancerinas —information + photos.

Spanish generals
Spanish diplomats
Captain Generals of Galicia
Viceroys of Peru
1580s births
1654 deaths
17th-century Peruvian people
Pedro 01
Knights of the Order of Alcántara
Pedro 01
1630s in Peru
1640s in Peru